FPU may stand for:

Universities 
 Florida Polytechnic University, in Lakeland, Florida, United States
 Franklin Pierce University, in New Hampshire, United States
 Fresno Pacific University, in California, United States
 Fukui Prefectural University, in Japan

Other uses 
 Federation of Progressive Unions, in Mauritius
 Federation of Trade Unions of Ukraine
 Fermi–Pasta–Ulam problem, former name of the Fermi–Pasta–Ulam–Tsingou (FPUT) problem
 Fishermen's Protective Union, a Newfoundland political party and service organization
 Floating-point unit, a computer component that handles mathematical operations on floating-point numbers
 Floor pick-up, a power supply scheme for bumper cars
 Progress Party's Youth